The Walney to Wear and Whitby Cycle Route (or W2W) is the name of a cross-country cycle route in Northern England. It runs from Walney Island in Cumbria to Sunderland on the River Wear or Whitby.

History
The route was launched on 1 June 2005 to complement the popular Sea to Sea Cycle Route (C2C) that runs from Whitehaven to Sunderland. It is designed to be slightly harder and longer than this other route, totalling either . When launched the route used sections of NCN Routes 72, 68 and 71 west of the Pennines. From Tan Hill to Sunderland a new Regional Route was created and given the number 20, with a blue background. In 2012, after improvements to meet National Cycle Network standards, it was upgrade to National Route 70. Route signs were changed to the number 70 with a red background. Around the same time the sections on the route that had previously been Route 71 and 72 were re-signed as Route 70. In 2007 a southern branch from Barnard Castle to Whitby was added. Originally classified as regional route 52, it was upgraded to National Cycle Route 165 in 2012.

Route

The W2W is a Y shaped route with one western leg from Walney to Barnard Castle, and two eastern legs Barnard Castle to Sunderland (northern) and Barnard Castle to Whitby (Southern).

Western Leg
 Walney to Barnard Castle

 From Walney Island in the Irish Sea  it goes on to the industrial port of Barrow-in-Furness
 It then runs through the Furness peninsula, passing towns such as Ulverston and the picturesque Grange-Over-Sands where the route follows the Promenade.
 The route continues to skirt the Lake District national park towards the historical market town of Kendal
 After this, the path continues northwards, before moving in an easterly direction towards Kirkby Stephen and through the Pennines to Barnard Castle in County Durham

North Eastern Leg
 Barnard Castle to Sunderland

 The northerly spur passes through Hamsterley, to reach the beautiful cathedral city of Durham. National Route 715 between Barnard Castle and Willington is an alternative W2W route. It is  shorter and easier ride via Bishop Auckland.
 The final  of the W2W follows the River Wear to the North Sea at Sunderland

South Eastern Leg
 Barnard Castle to Whitby
 From Barnard Castle the route descends off the Durham Dales along the lower Tees Valley for to Croft-on-Tees near Darlington.
 Continuing on flat roads for  until it reaches the North York Moors at Great Ayton.
 Following the Eskdale for the final  the route cross the River Esk 5 times before reaching Whitby. This section includes several steep climbs and descents, some of them are on off road tracks.

Footnotes

External links

The official website of the W2W
Wearside Sustrans website with links to details on the route in Wearside

Cycleways in England
National Cycle Routes
Furness